The volcano Pago is located East of Kimbe, West New Britain Province, Papua New Guinea. Pago is a young post-caldera cone within the Witori Caldera. The Buru Caldera cuts the SW flank of the Witori volcano. Biggest eruptions were at 4000±200 BC, VEI 6, 10 cubic kilometres (2.5 mi.3); 1370±100 BC, VEI6, 30 km3 (7 mi.3); and 710±75 AD, VEI 6, 20 km3 (5 mi.3) of tephra.

Pago erupted 8 times in the 500 years to 2002, including a major eruption in 1933. In 2002 the threat of a major eruption of Pago caused the evacuation of 15,000 people. Five volcanic explosive ash-plume advisories were issued related to Pago in the months May–July 2012.

References

Volcanoes of New Britain
Volcanoes of Papua New Guinea
VEI-6 volcanoes